Emma Louise Lipman (born 23 February 1989) is a professional footballer who plays as a defender for Como of Serie A, the top level of women's league football in Italy. Lipman was born and brought up in England but chose to play for Malta at international level.

Club career

Lipman joined Coventry City as a 10-year-old and was playing in their first team by the time she was 14 years old. After moving to Yorkshire to attend Leeds Beckett University, Lipman represented Leeds City Vixens and Leeds United in the FA Women's Premier League.

In July 2013 Lipman transferred to Manchester City. When Sheikh Mansour-backed Manchester City successfully bid for an FA WSL franchise in 2014, they handed Lipman a professional contract.

Lipman won a contract extension for Manchester City's 2015 season, but the club's purchase of England full-backs Lucy Bronze and Demi Stokes reduced her opportunities to play. In February 2016 she joined Sheffield FC, who had just been promoted into WSL 2.

In 2017 Lipman accepted an offer to play in Italy, with AGSM Verona. She featured in 21 of 22 league fixtures as the club secured a mid-table finish in Serie A. That prompted Roma to sign Lipman for their newly formed women's team. After playing in 17 of Roma's 22 2018–19 Serie A games, contributing one goal, Lipman signed for another Italian club Florentia San Gimignano in July 2019.

In July 2020 Lipman and her Maltese teammate Rachel Cuschieri signed for Lazio, who had narrowly missed promotion to Serie A the previous season.

International career

As well as England, Lipman was also eligible for the national teams of Scotland and Malta due to her grandparents. In May 2019 Lipman received a call-up to Malta's squad for a friendly match against Bolton Wanderers. She started Malta's 2–1 win at the Malta Football Association training grounds in Ta' Qali.

On 4 October 2019 Lipman won her first official cap for Malta, in a home UEFA Women's Euro 2021 qualifying Group B fixture against Italy. Although Lipman's handball conceded an injury time penalty kick, converted by Cristiana Girelli, Malta emerged with credit from their 2–0 defeat. Lipman retained her place in the team for the next qualifier, a 1–1 draw with Israel.

International goals

Honours
Manchester City
Women's League Cup: 2014

References

External links

 
 AS Roma player profile
 

Living people
1989 births
English women's footballers
Women's association football defenders
Women's Super League players
Manchester City W.F.C. players
Leeds United Women F.C. players
Coventry United W.F.C. players
Florentia San Gimignano S.S.D. players
Serie A (women's football) players
Leeds City Vixens L.F.C. players
English expatriate women's footballers
English expatriate sportspeople in Italy
Expatriate women's footballers in Italy
Sportspeople from Nuneaton
FA Women's National League players
Alumni of Leeds Beckett University
Sheffield F.C. Ladies players
A.S.D. AGSM Verona F.C. players
A.S. Roma (women) players
People with acquired Maltese citizenship
Malta women's international footballers
English people of Maltese descent
Maltese women's footballers
S.S. Lazio Women 2015 players
S.S.D. F.C. Como Women players